Władysław Tajner (17 September 1935 – 27 February 2012) was a Polish ski jumper. He competed at the 1956 and 1960 Winter Olympics.

References

1935 births
2012 deaths
Polish male ski jumpers
Olympic ski jumpers of Poland
Ski jumpers at the 1956 Winter Olympics
Ski jumpers at the 1960 Winter Olympics
People from Cieszyn County
People from Cieszyn Silesia
Sportspeople from Silesian Voivodeship
20th-century Polish people